Let Me Explain, Dear is a 1932 British comedy film directed by Gene Gerrard and Frank Miller and starring Gerrard, Viola Lyel and Claude Hulbert. It was adapted from the play A Little Bit of Fluff by Walter Ellis. It was made by British International Pictures.

Plot summary
A man tries to fake an accident in order to claim insurance money, but things soon go awry.

Cast
 Gene Gerrard as George Hunter 
 Viola Lyel as Angela Hunter 
 Claude Hulbert as Cyril Merryweather 
 Jane Carr as Mamie 
 Amy Veness as Aunt Fanny 
 Henry B. Longhurst as Dr. Coote 
 Hal Gordon as Parrott 
 C. Denier Warren as Jeweller 
 Reginald Bach as Taxi Driver

References

External links

1932 films
British comedy films
Films shot at British International Pictures Studios
British films based on plays
1932 comedy films
Films directed by Frank Miller (screenwriter)
Films directed by Gene Gerrard
Films set in London
British black-and-white films
1930s English-language films
1930s British films